The Hypersonic Air-breathing Weapon Concept (HAWC, pronounced "hawk") is a scramjet powered air-launched hypersonic cruise missile project at the U.S. Defense Advanced Research Projects Agency (DARPA), that had a successful hypersonic flight announced in September 2021. It is a kinetic energy weapon, without an explosive warhead.

The scramjet propelled the missile at "a speed greater than Mach 5 (over 3,700 miles per hour)".

The first successful flight was in September 2021. Further testing was carried out in mid-March 2022, but was kept secret at the time to avoid the impression of escalation against Russia during the Russian invasion of Ukraine. The existence of the test was revealed in early April 2022.

Principal Director for Hypersonics Mike White stated that HAWC would be smaller than hypersonic glide vehicles and could therefore launch from a wider range of platforms. White additionally noted that HAWC could integrate seekers more easily. DARPA requested
$60 million for MoHAWC, the successor program to HAWC, in FY2023.

DARPA plans to further these technological improvements through More Opportunities with HAWC program (MOHAWC).

Technology developed for the HAWC demonstrator was used to influence the design of the Hypersonic Attack Cruise Missile (HACM), a U.S. Air Force Program of Record to create a scramjet-powered hypersonic missile it could deploy as an operational weapon. The contract to develop HACM further was awarded to Raytheon in September 2022. HACM will use a Northrop Grumman scramjet.

References

Experimental missiles